Pierre-Yves Rochon (born 1946) is a French interior designer. He has designed luxury hotels and restaurants around the world.

Early life
Pierre-Yves Rochon was born in 1946. He grew up in Brittany.

Career
Rochon first worked for designer Michel Boyer.

Rochon started his own business in 1979. He has designed luxury hotels like the Four Seasons Hotel George V and the Shangri-La Hotel in Paris, the Savoy Hotel and the Four Seasons Hotel London at Park Lane in London, and the Waldorf Astoria Beverly Hills in Beverly Hills, California.

Personal life
Rochon has a wife, Annick, and a son. They reside in Paris.

Further reading

References

Living people
1946 births
People from Brittany
Businesspeople from Paris
French interior designers
French company founders